Svetislav Glišović (Serbian Cyrillic: Светислав Глишовић; 17 September 1913 – 10 March 1988) was a Serbian international football player and manager.

Club career
Glišović played in the youth team of SK Soko before becoming one of the main players of the BSK Beograd golden 1930s, he was, together with Tirnanić, Vujadinović, Marjanović and Božović, the main contributor to the attacking game of the club. Since his first appearance in the 1931–32 season, he won four national championships, and was the league top scorer, with ten goals in same number of matches, in the 1939–40 season. He spent a decade in the club, playing in both sides in the midfield and becoming famous for his speed and strong shot.

International career
Beside the 15 matches played for the Belgrade City selection, and three matches for the B national team, Glišović played an impressive 21 matches for the Yugoslavia national football team, having scored nine times. His debut was on 5 June 1932 in Belgrade against France, and his last match was on 14 April 1940 against Germany in Vienna.

Managerial career
In the first national Championship after the Second World War in 1945 the competition was organised by the selections of the six republics forming the new SFR Yugoslavia plus the Yugoslav Army team. Glišović was in charge as coach of the winning SR Serbia team. From the next season the championship was held normally, with clubs competing, and he was named the head coach of the Red Star Belgrade team, where he stayed for two years until 1948.

Afterwards, he continued his coaching career in Greece, Switzerland and the United States.

Honours
BSK Beograd
Yugoslav First League (4): 1932–33, 1934–35, 1935–36, 1938–39
Individual
Yugoslav First League top scorer (1): 1939–40

References

External links
 Profile at Serbian Federation website
 

1913 births
1988 deaths
Footballers from Belgrade
Serbian footballers
Yugoslav footballers
Yugoslavia international footballers
Yugoslav First League players
OFK Beograd players
Yugoslav expatriate footballers
Expatriate footballers in France
Yugoslav expatriate sportspeople in France
Expatriate soccer managers in the United States
Yugoslav expatriate sportspeople in the United States
Serbian football managers
Yugoslav football managers
Red Star Belgrade managers
Aris Thessaloniki F.C. managers
Association football midfielders
Grasshopper Club Zürich managers
Panathinaikos F.C. non-playing staff